Regula Rytz (born 2 March 1962) is a Swiss historian and politician of the Green Party of Switzerland. She was a member of the National Council from 2011 to 2022. From 2012 to 2016, she was the co-president of the Green Party of Switzerland. She was the party president from 2016 to 2020.

Early life, education and research 
Regula Rytz was born in Thun, Canton of Bern to Gisela Rytz-Flören, a musician, and Rudolf Rytz, an architect. She graduated as teacher (Swiss Lehrpatent) at the Thun seminary, and worked from 1983 to 1989 as teacher on public elementary school level (Volksschule). Rytz studied history at the University of Bern and graduated (Lizentiat) in history, sociology and constitutional law in 1997. Her coop-programs included projects for the educational department (Erziehungsdirektion) of the canton of Bern from 1990 to 1992, and assistance work for Professor Richard Bäumlin at the constitutional law seminary (Staatsrechtliches Seminar) in 1992 and 1993. From 1998 to 2000 she researched on the field of Gewalt im Alltag und organisierte Kriminalität (literally: violence in dailylife and organized crime) within the scope of a research program of the Swiss National Science Foundation (Nationalfonds) at her alma mater.

Political career 

Originally a member of the SP political party and a primary school teacher, Rytz came from Thun to Bern to study history and sociology. Rytz was member of the Student/innenrat, the student council of the University of Bern from 1988 to 1994. At the university she organized counter-events to the conventional lectures, reanimated the feminist science (Feministische Wissenschaft) association, and was member of the action group Kritische Uni (literally: Critical University) where she spent a "very self-determined and motion-oriented time. I had the chance to organize substantive discussions, without being clamped in a fixed political party hierarchy", she recalled in an interview in 2011. When she joined the Green Alliance (Grünes Bündnis Bern) in 1987, Rytz initially was a base member. Between 1993 and 1998 she was also engaged as political secretary of Grünes Bündnis Bern, a regional fraction of the Green Party of Switzerland. In this function, she was also responsible for the organizational and strategic management, and provided technical and policy advice of Therese Frösch, the finance director of Bern. In 1994 she was elected to the parliament of the Canton of Bern where Rytz also was engaged in commissions focussing on education policy, fiscal policy, economic policy and state policy by 2005. Then she was elected as executive member (Gemeinderätin) of the city of Bern where she directed the department Tiefbau, Verkehr und Stadtgrün that provided the municipal civil engineering, transport and the urban green areas. In 2008 she was re-elected, getting the most votes of all governmental members. By 2012, she was responsible for the implementation of large projects such as the reconstruction of the Bahnhofplatz plaza and the construction of Tram Bern West.

At the end of her tenure as member of the municipal executive in Bern, Rytz was elected to the National Council in the Swiss federal election in October 2011, and re-elected in October 2015. From May 2012 to April 2016 Rytz was co-president, in co-operation with Adèle Thorens, of the Green Party of Switzerland (Die Grünen). On 16 April 2016 she was elected as the party's exclusive president by further two years. In 2019, she ran for a seat in the Council of States, but was defeated by Hans Stöckli and Werner Salzmann.

In November 2019, she entered the race for the 2019 Federal Council election, seeking to turn out Igniazio Cassis. In the 2019 Swiss federal election, the Green and Green Liberal Party made significant gains in the National Council with the Greens becoming the fourth-largest party. Historically, the fourth-largest party in the council is elected to a seat on the Federal council. The three largest parties indicated that they would not support her candidacy. Despite their association on environmental issues, the leader of the more moderate GLP advised Rytz not to pursue the seat. Rytz was defeated in the election with members not wanting defeat the only member of the Swiss-Italian community.

Rytz stepped down as President of the Greens in 2020, having reached the eight-year term limit in office. She was succeeded by Balthasar Glättli.

Mandatory work 
From 2001 to 2004 Rytz was general secretary of the Swiss Federation of Trade Unions, focussing on labor law, health and free movement of persons. Regula Rytz is engaged as president of the cantonal commission for gender mainstreaming (Fachkommission für die Gleichstellung), as board member of the national Alpen-Initiative (Iniziativa da las Alps) and Lötschberg initiative committees, members of the board of directors (Verwaltungsrätin) of the municipal transport services in Biel/Bienne (Verkehrsbetriebe Biel), and board member of the cantonal section of the VCS Verkehrs-Club der Schweiz. The VCS is committed to sustainable mobility, endorses an optimum interaction between the different modes of transport. Regardless if automobile, tram or bike, whether on foot or by train and bus, the association relies on the combined mobility.

As member (Nationalrätin) of the Swiss National Council, Rytz is engaged in the commission for transport and telecommunication (Kommission für Verkehr und Fernmeldewesen). Rytz is also committed to the ongoing political Atomausstiegsinitiative campaign for a nuclear phase-out in Switzerland, stating that Switzerland is the only country in the world to issue iodine tablets to its population as a precautionary measure to a possible atomic design basis accident.

Personal life 
Rytz is in a relationship with Michael Jordi and lives in Bern-Breitenrain.

References

External links 

  
 

1962 births
Green Party of Switzerland politicians
Living people
Members of the National Council (Switzerland)
People from Bern
People from Thun
21st-century Swiss historians
20th-century Swiss historians
Swiss women historians
Swiss sociologists
Swiss women sociologists
Swiss feminists
Swiss activists
Swiss women activists
University of Bern alumni
Women members of the National Council (Switzerland)
20th-century Swiss women politicians
21st-century Swiss women politicians
20th-century Swiss politicians
21st-century Swiss politicians
Swiss schoolteachers
21st-century Swiss educators
20th-century Swiss educators
21st-century Swiss women writers
20th-century Swiss women writers
20th-century women educators
21st-century women educators